Pterostichus diligens is a species of ground beetle native to Europe.

References

External links
Images representing Pterostichus diligens  at Barcode of Life Data System

Pterostichus
Beetles described in 1824
Beetles of Europe